Discovery Academy may refer to:
 Discovery Academy, Stoke-on-Trent, a secondary school in Staffordshire, England
 Discovery Academy (Richmond Hill, Ontario), a private school in Canada
 Discovery Academy (Provo, Utah), a high school in Utah, US

See also
 Discovery (disambiguation)
 Discovery School (disambiguation)
 Discovery Elementary School (disambiguation)